Luísa Canziani dos Santos Silveira (born 11 April 1996) is a Brazilian politician and lawyer. She has spent her political career representing Paraná, having served in the state legislature since 2019.

Personal life
Canziani is the daughter of politician and lawyer Alex Canziani. She is an alumnus of the Pontifical Catholic University of Paraná.

Political career
Canziani was elected to the lower legislature of Brazil in the 2018 Brazilian general election, succeeding her father who had served 5 consecutive terms from 1999 to 2019. Taking office at just 22 years of age, she is the youngest ever member of the federal chamber of deputies.

References

1996 births
Living people
People from Londrina
21st-century Brazilian lawyers
Pontifical Catholic University of Paraná alumni
Brazilian Labour Party (current) politicians
Members of the Chamber of Deputies (Brazil) from Paraná
Brazilian women in politics